The 2012–13 Danish Women's Cup was the twenty-first edition of the Danish women's football national cup. It ran from April 16, 2012 to June 5, 2013.

Defending champion Brøndby IF defeated Fortuna Hjørring in the final, becoming the first team to win four editions in a row and reaching Fortuna in the top of the competition's palmares with seven trophies. It also marked its third consecutive double. The previous edition's final was repeated in the Round of 32, with Brøndby IF again beating BK Skjold by a wide margin.

Results

Final

References

Cup